VADS (formerly an initialism for Visual Arts Data Service) is a service of the Library at the University for the Creative Arts (UCA) in the UK that provides digital images and other visual arts resources free and copyright cleared for use in UK higher education and further education.

It has provided services to the academic community since 3 March 1997, and has built up a portfolio of visual art collections comprising over 140,000 images.

References

External links

Arts organisations based in the United Kingdom
Online databases
Educational organisations based in the United Kingdom
Copyright law organizations
Organizations established in 1997